Syed Rahmatur Rob Irtiza Ahsan was a Bangladeshi politician and the former Member of Parliament of Barguna-2.

Early life and family
Syed Rahmatur Rob Irtiza Ahsan was born on 21 June 1935, to a Bengali Muslim zamindar family known as the Syeds of Bamna based in Barguna, then located under the Backergunge District of the Bengal Presidency. His father, Syed Najmul Ahsan, was the son of Syed Abi Muhammad (d. 1951) and they traced their ancestry to Syed Mir Qadir Bakhsh, who belonged to the Syed family of Malidia in Faridpur. Irtiza Ahsan's great grandfather, Syed Mir Sarwar Jan (d. 1914), who was Bakhsh's son, migrated to Bamna in greater Barisal after marrying Azizunnesa, the daughter of Taluqdar Husayn ad-Din Chowdhury, and eventually inheriting the taluqdari of Ramna-Bamna. Ahsan's uncle Syed Ziaul Ahsan, was a speaker for the East Bengal Legislative Assembly during the United Front regime and married to Syeda Shaukat Ara Begum, the daughter of Syed Abdul Jabbar, a zamindar of Comilla. His other uncle Syed Moinul Ahsan, was the vice-principal of Dhaka College and the father of former secretariat Shamim Ahsan. Ahsan's youngest uncle, Syed Qamarul Ahsan, was a former parliamentarian. Syeda Sajeda Chowdhury, the incumbent deputy leader of the Jatiya Sangsad, is the daughter of Najmul Ahsan's cousin Syed Shah Hamidullah.

Career
During the Bangladesh Liberation War of 1971, Ahsan was the chairman of Bamna Union. Ahsan was elected to parliament from the new Barguna-2 constituency (formerly part of Patuakhali-1) as a Jatiya Party (Ershad) candidate in 1986. He contested the 1991 election as a candidate of National Democratic Party but lost to independent candidate Nurul Islam Moni.

References

1935 births
2020 deaths
Jatiya Party politicians
National Democratic Party (Bangladesh) politicians
3rd Jatiya Sangsad members
20th-century Bengalis
21st-century Bengalis
Bangladeshi people of Arab descent
People from Barguna district
People from Faridpur District